Guiba or Djiba is a village in Burkina Faso. It is famous for being the traditional place where Mossi crown princes lived before they became Moro Naba (king).

References

Zoundwéogo Province
Populated places in the Centre-Sud Region